William Paulson may refer to:
 William Paulson (judge)
 William Paulson (runner)